Thomas or Tom Porter may refer to:

 Thomas Porter (MP) (died 1522), English MP for Gloucester, 1515
 Thomas Porter (dramatist) (1636–1680), English dramatist and duellist
 Thomas Porter (Vermont politician) (1734–1833), Connecticut and Vermont military and political figure
 Thomas Colley Porter (1780–1833), mayor of Liverpool, England
 Thomas Porter (Wisconsin politician) (1830–?), Wisconsin political figure
 Thomas William Porter (1843–1920), New Zealand soldier and land purchase officer
 Thomas F. Porter (1847–1927), Massachusetts politician and mayor of Lynn, Massachusetts
 Tom Porter (coach) (1929–2013), American football and ice hockey coach
 Thomas Porter (cardiologist), American cardiologist
 Tom Porter (computer scientist), computer programmer at Pixar
 Robert Evelyn Porter (1913–1983), a.k.a. Tom Porter, Australian businessman and mayor of Adelaide, 1968–1971 
 Thomas Conrad Porter (1822–1901), American botanist and theologian